Ben Phillips (born 1981) is a Welsh rugby union player. A hooker, Phillips plays for Cardiff RFC after signing in the Summer of 2010, after a spell playing for Gloucester Rugby.

Phillips, who was born in Bridgend, formerly played for Bridgend RFC, Manly RUFC, Pontypridd RFC, Doncaster R.F.C., Birmingham and Solihull R.F.C. and Gloucester Rugby.

References

1981 births
Doncaster R.F.C. players
Gloucester Rugby players
Living people
Rugby union players from Bridgend
Pontypridd RFC players
Welsh rugby union players
Sportspeople from Gloucestershire
Rugby union hookers